Richard Arnold "Groove" Holmes  (May 2, 1931 – June 29, 1991) was an American jazz organist who performed in the hard bop and soul jazz genre. He is best known for his 1965 recording of "Misty".

Career
Holmes's first album, on Pacific Jazz with guest Ben Webster, was recorded in March 1961. He recorded many albums for Pacific Jazz, Prestige, Groove Merchant, and Muse, many of them with Houston Person.

He died of a heart attack after battling prostate cancer, having performed his last concerts in a wheelchair. One of his last gigs was at the 1991 Chicago Blues Festival with his longtime friend, singer Jimmy Witherspoon.

Discography

As leader
 "Groove" (Les McCann Presents the Dynamic Jazz Organ of Richard "Groove" Holmes) [also released as That Healin' Feelin' ] (Pacific Jazz, 1961) – with Ben Webster
 Groovin' with Jug (Pacific Jazz, 1961) – with Gene Ammons
 Somethin' Special (Pacific Jazz, 1962) – with Les McCann
 After Hours (Pacific Jazz, 1961–1962)
 Tell It Like It Tis (Pacific Jazz, 1961–1962 [rel. 1966])
 Book of the Blues Vol. 1 (Warner Bros., 1964) – with Onzy Matthews' orchestra [note: reissued on Groove Hut (#66707) in 2009]
 A Bowl of Soul (Loma/WB, 1966 [rel. 1967]) – with Onzy Matthews' orchestra [note: reissued on Groove Hut (#66707) in 2009]
 Blues For Spoon And Groove (Surrey, 1965) – with Jimmy Witherspoon [reissued as Groovin' and Spoonin'  on Olympic/Everest in 1973]
 Soul Message (Prestige, 1965; CD reissue: OJC, 1988) [note: includes the original "full–length" version (6:00) of "Misty"]
 Living Soul (Recorded Live! at Count Basie's) (Prestige, 1966)
 On Basie's Bandstand [live] (Prestige, 1966 [rel. 2003])
 Soul Mist! (Prestige, 1966 [rel. 1970])
 Misty (Prestige, 1965–1966; CD reissue: OJC, 1992)
 Spicy! (Prestige, 1966)
 Super Soul (Prestige, 1967) – with Richard Evans
 Get Up & Get It! (Prestige, 1967)
 Soul Power! (Prestige, 1967)
 The Groover! (Prestige, 1968)
 That Healin' Feelin' (Prestige, 1968) – with Rusty Bryant
 Welcome Home (World Pacific, 1968)
 Workin' on a Groovy Thing (World Pacific, 1968)
 X–77: Richard "Groove" Holmes Recorded Live at the Lighthouse (World Pacific, 1969)
 Come Together (World Pacific, 1970) – with Ernie Watts
 Comin' on Home (Blue Note, 1971)
 American Pie (Groove Merchant, 1972)
 Night Glider (Groove Merchant, 1973)
 Giants of the Organ Come Together (Groove Merchant, 1973) – with Jimmy McGriff
 Giants of the Organ in Concert (Groove Merchant, 1973) – with Jimmy McGriff
 New Groove (Groove Merchant, 1974)
 Onsaya Joy [live] (Flying Dutchman, 1975)
 Six Million Dollar Man (Flying Dutchman, 1975)
 I'm in the Mood for Love (Flying Dutchman, 1976)
 Shippin' Out (Muse, 1977)
 Good Vibrations (Muse, 1977 [rel. 1980]) – with Houston Person, Bob DeVos, Idris Muhammad
 Dancing in the Sun (Versatile, 1978)
 Star Wars/Close Encounters (Versatile, 1978)
 Broadway (Muse, 1980; reissue: 32 Jazz, 1998) – with Houston Person
 Swedish Lullaby (Sison, 1984)
 Blues All Day Long (Muse, 1988; reissue: 32 Jazz, 1999) – with Cecil Bridgewater, Houston Person, Jimmy Ponder
 African Encounter (Muse, 1988)
 Hot Tat (Muse, 1989 [rel. 1991]) – with Cecil Bridgewater, Houston Person, Jimmy Ponder

LP/CD compilations
 Richard "Groove" Holmes: Jazz Milestone Series (Pacific Jazz, 1966) (compilation of Pacific Jazz material)
 The Best of Richard "Groove" Holmes (Prestige, 1969) (compilation of Prestige material)
 The Best of Richard "Groove" Holmes: For Beautiful People (Prestige, 1970) (another compilation of Prestige material)
 Hunk–a–Funk (Groove Merchant, 1975) (compilation of Night Glider + New Groove)
 Supa Cookin'  (Groove Merchant, 1975)  – with Jimmy McGriff (compilation of Giants of the Organ Come Together + Giants of the Organ in Concert)
 Groovin' With Groove (LRC [Lester Radio Corporation], 1994) (compilation of Groove Merchant albums: American Pie, Night Glider, New Groove)
 Blue Groove (Prestige, 1994) (compilation of Get Up & Get It! + Soul Mist!)
 After Hours (Pacific Jazz, 1996) (compilation of After Hours + Tell It Like It Is)
 Legends of Acid Jazz: Richard "Groove" Holmes (Prestige, 1997) (compilation of The Groover! + That Healin' Feelin)
 Groove's Groove (32 Jazz, 1998) (compilation of Muse albums: Shippin' Out, Good Vibrations, Broadway, Blues All Day Long)
 Legends of Acid Jazz: Richard "Groove" Holmes – Spicy (Prestige, 1999) (compilation of Living Soul + Spicy!)
 The Best of the Pacific Jazz Years (Pacific Jazz/EMI, 2001) (compilation of Pacific Jazz material)
 Timeless: Richard "Groove" Holmes (Savoy Jazz/Denon, 2003) (compilation of Muse material)
 Super Soul (Prestige, 2004) (compilation of Soul Power! + Super Soul)

As sidemanWith Earl BosticJazz As I Feel It (King, 1963; reissued as Complete Quintet Recordings on Lone Hill Jazz in 2006) – with Joe Pass 
A New Sound (King, 1964; reissued as Complete Quintet Recordings on Lone Hill Jazz in 2006) – with Joe PassWith Bumble Bee SlimBack in Town (Pacific Jazz, 1962)With Willis JacksonIn Chateauneuf-du-Pape 1980 [also released as Ya Understand Me?] (Disques Black And Blue, 1980; Muse, 1984; reissued as Live On Stage (The Definitive Black & Blue Sessions) on Black & Blue in 2003 with 3 bonus tracks)With Eric KlossLove and All That Jazz (Prestige, 1966)With Les McCannLes McCann Sings (Pacific Jazz, 1961)With Lou RawlsBlack and Blue (Capitol, 1963)With Dakota StatonMadame Foo-Foo (Groove Merchant, 1972)With Gerald Wilson''' You Better Believe It! (Pacific Jazz, 1961)Eternal Equinox'' (Pacific Jazz, 1969)

References

External links
Richard "Groove" Holmes
Richard "Groove" Holmes discography at Jazzlists

Soul-jazz organists
Hard bop organists
American jazz organists
American male organists
American jazz composers
American male jazz composers
1931 births
1991 deaths
Blue Note Records artists
Muse Records artists
Deaths from prostate cancer
Deaths from cancer in Missouri
20th-century American composers
Musicians from Camden, New Jersey
Black & Blue Records artists
20th-century American male musicians
20th-century jazz composers
20th-century African-American musicians